Dimitrios Siopis (born 6 September 1995) is a Greek professional footballer who plays for Alexandroupoli FC. In the past, he played in Olympiacos.

Personal life
Siopis is the younger brother of Trabzonspor and Greece midfielder Manolis.

Honours
Sparta
Gamma Ethniki: 2015–16

OFI
Football League: 2017–18

References

1995 births
Living people
People from Evros (regional unit)
Greek footballers
Greek expatriate footballers
Association football defenders
Olympiacos F.C. players
Fostiras F.C. players
A.E. Sparta P.A.E. players
OFI Crete F.C. players
Doxa Drama F.C. players
MFK Zemplín Michalovce players
Gamma Ethniki players
Football League (Greece) players
Super League Greece 2 players
Slovak Super Liga players
Expatriate footballers in Slovakia
Greek expatriate sportspeople in Slovakia
Footballers from Eastern Macedonia and Thrace